Raymond Henry Hamann (August 19, 1911 – May 7, 2005) was an American professional basketball player and college coach. By playing in the National Basketball League for the Oshkosh All-Stars during the 1937–38 and 1938–39 seasons, Hamann became the first South Dakotan to play organized professional basketball. He also competed for the All-Stars when they were a barnstorming independent team.

Hamann played college basketball at Wisconsin from 1932–33 to 1934–35 and helped guide the Badgers to a co-conference championship as a senior. During his professional career he coached basketball at Kimberly and Appleton high schools. He served in the Navy during World War II. When he returned, Hamann earned a master's degree from Lawrence University in Appleton, Wisconsin, while also serving as their head men's basketball coach from 1942–43 to 1944–45. Although he compiled a cumulative record of 11 wins and 15 losses, he led the Vikings to a Midwest Conference championship in his first season.

Hamann died on May 7, 2005 in his hometown of Yankton, South Dakota.

References

1911 births
2005 deaths
American men's basketball players
United States Navy personnel of World War II
Schoolteachers from South Dakota
Basketball coaches from South Dakota
Basketball players from South Dakota
College men's basketball head coaches in the United States
Forwards (basketball)
Guards (basketball)
High school basketball coaches in the United States
Lawrence University alumni
Lawrence Vikings men's basketball coaches
Military personnel from South Dakota
Oshkosh All-Stars players
People from Yankton, South Dakota
Wisconsin Badgers men's basketball players